Admiral Johnson may refer to:
Alfred Wilkinson Johnson (1876–1963), U.S. Navy vice admiral. 
Charles Johnson (Royal Navy officer) (1869–1930), British Royal Navy admiral
Gregory G. Johnson (born 1946), U.S. Navy admiral
Harvey E. Johnson Jr. (fl. 1970s–2000s), U.S. Coast Guard vice admiral
James Johnson (South African Navy officer) (1918–1990), South African Navy vice admiral
Jay L. Johnson (born 1946), U.S. Navy admiral
Jerome L. Johnson (born 1935), U.S. Navy admiral
Roy L. Johnson (1906–1999), U.S. Navy admiral
Stephen E. Johnson (born 1955), U.S. Navy rear admiral

See also
Folke Hauger Johannessen (1913–1997), Royal Norwegian Navy admiral
Rolf Johannesson (1900–1989), German Bundesmarine Konteradmiral (rear admiral equivalent)